Helerson Mateus do Nascimento (born 28 October 1997), commonly known as Helerson, is a Brazilian footballer who plays for Joinville as a defender.

Career statistics

Club

References

1997 births
Living people
Brazilian footballers
Brazilian expatriate footballers
Association football defenders
Campeonato Brasileiro Série A players
Liga Portugal 2 players
Botafogo de Futebol e Regatas players
G.D. Estoril Praia players
Brazilian expatriate sportspeople in Portugal
Expatriate footballers in Portugal
People from Bedford Roxo